Action Jackson is a 1988 American action film directed by Craig R. Baxley in his feature film directorial debut, and starring Carl Weathers, Vanity, Craig T. Nelson, and Sharon Stone. The film was released in the United States on February 12, 1988.

Paula Abdul was the film choreographer. The film was released by Lorimar Film Entertainment. Although the film was quite successful at the box office, it received mostly negative reviews. Vanity was nominated for a Golden Raspberry Award as Worst Actress.

Plot
The prologue shows two auto-worker union officials addressing the recent death of a peer. Within moments, both are brutally murdered by a group of shadowy, almost supernatural killers that seem to move, disappear and reappear at will during a daring skyscraper assault.

Detroit Police Department Detective Sergeant Jericho Jackson, known locally as "Action Jackson", was a celebrated lieutenant in the police force but demoted (nearly two years before) because of a case he headed involving the criminal son of successful businessman Peter Anthony Dellaplane. The fallout over the case also collapsed Jackson's marriage and put the law-school-educated, star athlete and hometown hero at odds with the public. Even after his demotion, Jackson's continued interest leads to conflicts with his commander, Captain Armbruster, but he begins investigating Dellaplane's professional exploits, eventually uncovering a string of murdered trade-union members connected to Dellaplane's company. He discovers Dellaplane is secretly maneuvering into a "behind-the-throne" seat of power, and has been using a group of assassins, "The Invisible Men", to murder uncooperative union officials.

Jackson is assisted by Dellaplane's mistress, Sydney Ash, a local lounge singer and heroin addict, whom the businessman has assisted financially. He is eventually framed in the murder of Dellaplane's wife Patrice (who was actually killed by her husband, after her discovery of his plot, and her seeking help from Jackson). On the run from the police, Jackson is helped by friends from his old neighborhood: Kid Sable, a local hotel owner and retired professional boxer and Dee, a lively local hairdresser (and gossip informant) who gives Jackson a way to discreetly get to Dellaplane.

Jackson and Sydney arrange a meeting with Dellaplane's figurehead replacement for the auto union, unaware that The Invisible Men had been tracking them and allowed the meeting so that Dellaplane could confront Jackson face to face. Before he leaves with Sydney in tow, Dellaplane arrogantly reveals the reasoning for his plans and intends to exact it using Jackson as a pawn. He intends to kill Jackson, put one of The Invisible Men in his place, have him kill an important union official, and then have Jackson's charred body discovered after he failed his getaway. "Dellaplane, one of these days you are really going to piss me off," Jackson calls after his nemesis as he leaves with all but three of The Invisible Men. "We're going to have ourselves a little barbecue," claims Shaker, The Invisible Men's leader, as they prepare to burn Jackson alive. But Jackson is suddenly rescued by Sydney's bodyguard "Big" Edd and the pair battle the Invisible Men. Edd overpowers Birch, knocking him into a control panel, electrocuting him, while Jackson turns the welding torch they were about to use on him on Thaw, who is killed when the gasoline can he is holding explodes. Shaker opens fire on the pair with his grenade launcher, sending them running for cover. They lure him outside where Edd disarms him and Jackson takes the grenade launcher. Jackson opens fire and kills Shaker.

Jackson's escape leads to a fight at Dellaplane's mansion during the birthday party for the union leader Dellaplane plans to have assassinated. During the melee, the other members of The Invisible Men are killed by Jackson (who personally deals with the one set to make the kill and frame him), Edd, Jackson's old partner Detective Kotterwell, and a rehabilitated young thief named Albert, with help from Kid Sable. However, Dellaplane takes Sydney hostage and hides inside a bedroom in his mansion. After being given a gun by Kotterwell, Jackson commandeers a car being displayed at the party, crashes into the house, kills Dellaplane's butler/bodyguard, Cartier by ramming him into a wall as the latter fires at him, and roars upstairs to crash into the room Dellaplane is holding Sydney in. After a brief standoff, Dellaplane, (a trained martial artist) challenges Jackson to hand-to-hand combat. At first Dellaplane has the upper hand, but after ramming Jackson into one of the car windows, he is abruptly shoved back by Jackson, who turns and shouts "Now you've pissed me off!" Jackson proceeds to thrash Dellaplane. In desperation, Dellaplane goes for his gun, only for Jackson to seize his own and engage in a crossfire exchange, with Jackson killing Dellaplane and receiving a wound in the shoulder. Captain Armbruster arrives with reinforcements, informs Jackson that he wants a full report on his desk "in the morning..." and calls Jackson "Lieutenant." Sydney soon reveals she plans to go "cold turkey" off of heroin, promising Jackson can have her "on Thanksgiving." Jackson replies, "Can I have you any sooner?" Sydney giggles and the two kiss passionately as the credits start.

Cast

 Carl Weathers as Sergeant Jericho "Action" Jackson
 Craig T. Nelson as Peter Anthony Dellaplane
 Vanity as Sydney Ash
 Sharon Stone as Patrice Dellaplane
 Bill Duke as Captain Earl Armbruster
 Robert Davi as Tony Moretti
 Jack Thibeau as Detective Kotterwell
 Armelia McQueen as Dee
 Stan Foster as Albert Smith
 Roger Aaron Brown as Officer Lack
 Thomas F. Wilson as Officer Kornblau
 Edgar Small as Raymond Foss 
 Chino 'Fats' Williams as "Kid" Sable
 Prince A. Hughes as Edd
 Frank McCarthy as Oliver O'Rooney
 De'Voreaux White as Clovis
 Dennis Hayden as Shaker
 David Glen Eisley as Thaw
 Bob Minor as Gamble
 David Efron as Birch
 Brian Libby as Marlin
 Nicholas Worth as Cartier
 Branscombe Richmond as Poolroom Thug #1
 Miguel Nunez as Poolroom Thug #2
 Richard L. Duran as Poolroom Thug #3
 Charles Meshack as Poolroom Bartender
 Ken Belsky as Red Devil Bartender
 Al Leong as Dellaplane's Chauffeur
 Ed O'Ross as Frank Stringer
 Mary Ellen Trainor as Liz Massetori, Secretary
 Jim Haynie as "Morty" Morton
 Alonzo Brown as Big Lady With Purse
 Harri James as Hooker
 Ivor Barry as Stuffy Old Man
 Michael McManus as Lionel Grantham
 John Lyons as Yacht Guard #1
 Glenn R. Wilder as Yacht Guard #2
 Steve Vandeman as Yacht Guard #3
 Sonny Landham as Mr. Quick
 James Lew as Martial Arts Instructor
 Matt Landers as Desk Sergeant #1
 Thomas Wagner as Desk Sergeant #2
 Norman D. Wilson as Man In Bar (uncredited)

Production

Carl Weathers later called the film:
A creation that came about when I was doing Predator and talking to Joel Silver, who loved blaxploitation movies. Joel said, "Well, you know, why don't you put something together?" So during that time of shooting down in Puerto Vallarta, I created this story and came up with this guy – or at least this title – Action Jackson. And Joel found a writer [who] wrote the screenplay, and that was it. We got it made.

In 1990 Weathers starred in Dangerous Passion, an action film, which was released in Germany under the title Action Jackson 2, although it did not relate to the original film.

Soundtrack
The Action Jackson: Original Soundtrack Album features new music by Sister Sledge, The Pointer Sisters, Vanity, and Herbie Hancock. Vanity's two songs, "Faraway Eyes" and "Undress," were produced by musician Jesse Johnson.

Reception
While successful at the box office, the film received a negative reception from critics.

Weathers said he hoped the film would become a franchise "but Lorimar sold the lot to Sony and sold the library to Warner Bros., and that was that. It never resurfaced again, unfortunately."

The film received a score of 13% on Rotten Tomatoes from 15 reviews. On Metacritic the film has a weighted average score of 36 out of 100, based on 9 critics, indicating "generally unfavorable reviews". It grossed $20 million on an $8 million budget, and made another $45 million in VHS sales.

In popular culture
The film is the subject of the first season Lazor Wulf episode, "Keep It Moving," in which the last VHS copy of the film has been stolen, and the main characters attempt to recreate moments they believe are in the film in order to become more like Action Jackson and retrieve the tape.

The film would be referenced again in the second season Lazor Wulf episode, "Keep Going," where this time the series' titular character is convinced that Action Jackson is a documentary and pesters Carl Weathers into admitting that the actor himself killed off the character. In the episode, Weathers is voiced by WWE Superstar Xavier Woods, who previously wrestled in Total Nonstop Action Wrestling under the name Consequences Creed, in a gimmick inspired by Weathers' Apollo Creed character from the Rocky film series.

See also
 List of action films of the 1980s
 List of American films of 1988

References

External links
 
 
 
 

1988 films
1988 action films
American independent films
1980s English-language films
Blaxploitation films
Films about terrorism in the United States
Films directed by Craig R. Baxley
Films produced by Joel Silver
Films scored by Herbie Hancock
Films scored by Michael Kamen
Films set in Detroit
American police detective films
Fictional portrayals of the Detroit Police Department
Silver Pictures films
Warner Bros. films
African-American action films
1980s chase films
1988 directorial debut films
1980s American films